Victor Gruschka Springer (born in Jacksonville, Florida on 2 June 1928) is Senior Scientist emeritus, Division of Fishes at the Smithsonian Institution's National Museum of Natural History in Washington, D.C.
He is a specialist in the anatomy, classification, and distribution of fishes, with a special interest in tropical marine shorefishes. He has published numerous scientific studies on these subjects; also, a popular book called "Sharks in Question, the Smithsonian Answer Book" 1989.

Education
Springer gained his first degree, B.A. in Biology at Emory University in 1948. His M.S. in Botany at the University of Miami in 1954 was followed by his Ph.D in Zoology at the University of Texas in 1957.

Research Interests
Springer's research interests include the classification, evolution, and biogeography of fishes, especially marine fishes and notably Blennioid fishes. He is also interested in late 19th and 20th Century scientific illustrators of fishes such as Charles Bradford Hudson

Selected publications

Taxon described by him
See :Category:Taxa named by Victor G. Springer

Taxon named in his honor 
Biwia springeri (Bănărescu & Nalbant 1973) was named in honor of Springer who collected the type specimen.
The Springer's dragonet, Synchiropus springeri R. Fricke, 1983 was named after him as it was he who collected the type specimens during his Fiji Islands Expedition in 1982 and loaned them and many other specimens to describer Fricke for examination.
The Springer's barbelgoby, Gobiopsis springeri, is a species of goby found in the Western Central Pacific Ocean.

References

21st-century American biologists
1928 births
Living people